Nancy Jebet Langat (born 22 August 1981) is a Kenyan middle distance, runner who specialises in the 1500 metres. She won the gold medal in the 1500 m at the 2008 Summer Olympics, in a personal best time of 4:00.23.

She also competed at the 2004 Summer Olympics and the 2005 World Championships, without reaching the finals. In her younger days she mainly competed in the 800 metres, and was successful as a junior.

Langat won gold at the 2008 Summer Olympics in Beijing and became the second Kenyan woman to win an Olympic gold. The first one was Pamela Jelimo, who won the 800 m at the same Olympics. At the 2009 World Championships, Langat did not advance past the semifinals, but finished the season with a win at the World Athletics Final.

In 2010 Langat won the prestigious Diamond League tally for the 1500 m. She went undefeated in all of her races against the best runners in the world. He performance at the 2010 IAAF Continental Cup was a controversial one, as she attempted to pull back Hind Dehiba as the two duelled in the final straight. Langat fell and finished last. She claimed an 800/1500 m middle distance double at the 2010 Commonwealth Games, however, and was chosen as the Kenyan Sportswoman of the Year in December.

Langat had less success on the 2011 Diamond League circuit: on her two appearances, at the Golden Gala and Prefontaine Classic, she came fifth both times. She topped the podium in the 1500 m at the 2011 Military World Games, but was eliminated in the semi-finals at the 2011 World Championships in Athletics. She suffered a knee injury in 2012 and missed the opportunity to defend her Olympic title.

Personal life
Nancy Langat is married to marathon runner Kenneth Cheruiyot. Her oldest son turned six on the day that she won Olympic Gold. She was recruited by Kenya Air Force and is based at the Moi Air Base in Nairobi. Her father Joseph Langat was an international level long-distance runner.

Achievements

References

1981 births
Living people
Kenyan female middle-distance runners
Athletes (track and field) at the 2004 Summer Olympics
Athletes (track and field) at the 2008 Summer Olympics
Olympic athletes of Kenya
Olympic gold medalists for Kenya
Athletes (track and field) at the 1998 Commonwealth Games
Athletes (track and field) at the 2010 Commonwealth Games
Commonwealth Games gold medallists for Kenya
Commonwealth Games medallists in athletics
Medalists at the 2008 Summer Olympics
Olympic gold medalists in athletics (track and field)
Kenyan female cross country runners
Diamond League winners
IAAF World Athletics Final winners
20th-century Kenyan women
21st-century Kenyan women
Medallists at the 2010 Commonwealth Games